Phang Nga Football Club (Thai สโมสรฟุตบอลจังหวัดพังงา ) is a Thai semi professional football club based in Phang Nga Province. They currently play in Regional League Division 2 Southern.

Stadium and locations

Season by season record

Current squad

External links 
 Official Website

 
Football clubs in Thailand
Association football clubs established in 2009
Phang Nga province
2009 establishments in Thailand